Maxim  "Max" Plakuschenko (or Plakushchenko, ; born January 4, 1996) is a Ukrainian-born Israeli association footballer who plays for Nemzeti Bajnokság I club Budapest Honvéd.

Early life
Plakuschenko was born in Vinnytsia, Ukraine. At the age of 3 he immigrated to Israel with his family, and resided in the city of Kiryat Ata, Israel.

Club career

By the age of 6, He began to play soccer in the youth division of Hapoel Haifa. On 21 February 2015, he made his debut in the club's senior team, when he entered as a substitute in the 90th minute in a 2–0 win over Maccabi Tel Aviv.
On 23 January 2019, he joined Maccabi Haifa on a 3.5 year deal worth €150,000 per season

International career
Plakuschenko has capped as a youth International for Israel.

In 2018 he was called up for the Israel national football team.

Honours

Club
Hapoel Haifa
 Israel State Cup (1): 2017–18
 Israel Super Cup (1): 2018–19

See also
List of Israelis

References

1996 births
Living people
Israeli footballers
Hapoel Haifa F.C. players
Maccabi Haifa F.C. players
Hapoel Hadera F.C. players
Budapest Honvéd FC players
Israeli Premier League players
Nemzeti Bajnokság I players
Footballers from Kiryat Ata
Israeli expatriate footballers
Expatriate footballers in Hungary
Israeli expatriate sportspeople in Hungary
Israel under-21 international footballers
Israel youth international footballers
Ukrainian emigrants to Israel
Association football midfielders
Footballers from Vinnytsia
Israeli people of Ukrainian descent
Israeli people of Soviet descent